O Dono do Mar is a Brazilian film of 2006.

Synopsis 

The owner of the Sea delves into the mythical world of the fishermen of Maranhão, through the life of Antão Cristório (Jackson Costa). Created in the hardness of the labors of the sea, this man of strong character loses a child Jerumenho still very young, murdered by the knife of a cuckolded husband, a party of Bumba-meu-boi. The unsurpassed loss of beloved son, prepared by his father from childhood, to succeed him at work in the field of fisheries and the secrets of the great sea of Antão Cristório takes forever the prospect of the future. The fisherman turns his back on tomorrow and facing the past, tells his story.

References

External links

2006 films
Brazilian drama films
2000s Portuguese-language films